Kenneth Robert Maxwell (born February 3, 1941) is a British historian of Iberia and Latin America, educated at St John’s College, Cambridge University, where he studied under professor Sir Harry Hinsley and Ronald Robinson (1960-1963) and Princeton University where his supervisor was professor Stanley Stein (1964-1970). He was a Newberry library Gulbenkian fellow in Chicago (1968-1969). He was an
assistant and later an associate professor of history at the University of Kansas in Lawrence (1969-1971). From 1971 until 1975 he was the Herodotus fellow at the Institute Advanced Study at Princeton. He was an associate professor of history and the director of the Camões Center at Columbia university (1976-1989). He was the program director of the Tinker Foundation (1977-1983). A long time member of the Council on Foreign Relations for fifteen years he headed its Latin America Studies Program and was the director of studies and vice-president in 1996. He was the first Nelson and David Rockefeller Senior Fellow for Inter-American Affairs (1996-2004). He was the Western Hemisphere book reviewer for Foreign Affairs from 1995 until 2004. His May 13, 2004 resignation from the council and Foreign Affairs involved a major controversy over whether there had been a breach of the so-called "church-state separation" between the council itself and its magazine Foreign Affairs. , Maxwell was a professor of History at Harvard University and a senior fellow at the university's David Rockefeller Center for Latin American Studies, where he established and was the founding director the Brazil Studies Program.{{cn| (2004-2013) He was a weekly columnist for the Folha de São Paulo (2005-2015) and Globo (2015- ) and has written for the New York Review of Books and other publications.

Selected bibliography
 Conflicts and Conspiracies: Brazil and Portugal, 1750-1808 (1973)(2004)
 The Press and the Rebirth of Iberian Democracy (1983)
.  Portugal in the 1980s (1988)
 The New Spain: From Isolation to Influence (1994)
 The Making of Portuguese Democracy (1995)
 Pombal, Paradox of the Enlightenment (1995)
 Naked Tropics: Essays on Empire and Other Rogues (2003)

References

External links
 Kenneth Maxwell's website at the David Rockefeller Center for Latin American Studies at Harvard University
Kenneth Maxwell’s website: krmaxwell.com

1941 births
Living people
21st-century American historians
21st-century American male writers
Historians of the United States
Operation Condor
Harvard University staff
Historians of Latin America
Latin Americanists
Recipients of the Great Cross of the National Order of Scientific Merit (Brazil)
Brazilianists
American male non-fiction writers